Parc des Expositions is a station on the RER B's Airport branch. It is in the town of Villepinte in the Seine-Saint-Denis department and serves the Parc des Expositions de Villepinte convention centre. The station is at kilometre 21.01 of the airport branch of the RER B (branch B3). As part of the RER B upgrade, an additional platform is due to be built. 

The station sees services between Paris-Charles de Gaulle Airport and Robinson or Saint-Rémy-lès-Chevreuse via Gare du Nord in Paris. Also, it will be served by the Paris Metro Line 17 from Saint-Denis Pleyel to Le Mesnil-Amelot as part of Grand Paris Express. Trains run every 15 minutes throughout the day, with additional services during the peak hours.

References

The information in this article is based on that in its French equivalent.

External links

 

Réseau Express Régional stations
Buildings and structures in Seine-Saint-Denis
Railway stations in France opened in 1983